Punta San Matteo is a secondary peak of Ortler-Vioz in the Ortler Alps, at the border between the Province of Sondrio (Lombardy region) and Trentino (Trentino-Alto Adige/Südtirol region) in northern Italy.

It was the scene of the Battle of San Matteo in World War I, which, until the 1999 Kargil war, has been the highest battlefield in modern warfare history.

Climbing Punta San Matteo
The easiest approach and the normal route starts from the Gavia Pass side with a good access road from Bormio. It is best to park in the vicinity of the Berni hut and the monument which is on the opposite side of the road. This is an alpinist glacier tour and the glacier is full of crevasses. The climb can be done in one day.

An alternative option is to start from the same place but, instead of climbing up the glacier, walk in the direction of the Bivacco Battaglione Ortles which is at 3122 m of elevation, there is no guardian and it is always open. The Bivacco can be reached in 3 hours from the road. In summer this is just a walk up with no snow on the route all the way to the Bivacco. There are 6 places for sleeping and blankets are available. There is a wood burning stove inside. You can stay the night in the Bivacco and then follow the ridge route to the summit of Punta San Matteo.

Huts
The mentioned Rifugio A. Berni is the most convenient place if you want to climb the mountain directly from the road. The closest refuge to the summit from this side is the previously mentioned Bivacco Battaglione Ortles (3122 m). There is also Rifugio Bonetta directly on the Gavia Pass with plenty of free parking space around.

External links
 Bivacco Battaglione Ortles in Mountains for Everybody.
 San Matteo in Summit Post.

Further reading 
 Peter Holl: Alpenvereinsführer Ortleralpen, 9. Auflage, Munich (2003)  OCLC 231128013
 The Alpine Journal, Volume III, page 145, London 1865
 Eduard Richter (Redaktion): Die Erschließung der Ostalpen, II. Band, Verlag des Deutschen und Oesterreichischen Alpenvereins, Berlin, (1894)
 Casa Editrice Tabacco, Udine: Carta topografica 1:25.000, Blatt 08, Ortles-Cevedale/Ortlergebiet

Mountains of the Alps
Mountains of Trentino
Mountains of Lombardy
Alpine three-thousanders
Ortler Alps